Vladimir Alexandrovich Torlopov (Torlopov Öľöksan Voloď; born 1949) is a Russian politician, who was the head of the Komi Republic, a federal subject of Russia. In December 2001, he won elections with 40% of the vote, defeating incumbent head Yury Spiridonov. Torlopov took office in January 2002 and left on 15 January 2010.

In 1995 he became Chairman of the State Council of the Komi Republic.

On October 6, 2016 it has been under house arrest for the creation and leadership of a criminal association in conjunction with the "grouping" Gayzer and fraud on a large scale using his official position. Torlopov pleaded guilty.

References 

1949 births
Living people
People from Syktyvkar
Heads of the Komi Republic
Russian politicians convicted of crimes
Heads of government who were later imprisoned
Members of the Federation Council of Russia (after 2000)